"After You" is a song recorded by Dionne Warwick for her 1979 album Dionne: released as the album's third single in the spring of 1980, "After You" would peak at number 65 on the U.S. Billboard Hot 100.  It also reached number 10 on the Adult Contemporary chart.

"After You" had first been recorded by Warwick's aunt Cissy Houston in 1978 for her album Think It Over, the song's composers: Doug Frank and Doug James, being staff writers for Love-Zager Productions, which firm produced Houston's album. However Frank and James had written "After You" in hopes of having Barry Manilow record it: receiving a demo of the song from its composers, Manilow—who was producing the Dionne album—had Warwick record the song.

The song was also recorded by the Manhattans for their 1979 album Love Talk, and by Chuck Jackson for his 1980 album I Wanna Give You Some Love.

Chart history

References

External links
  (Original studio audio)

1978 songs
1980 singles
Dionne Warwick songs
Cissy Houston songs
Arista Records singles
1970s ballads
Contemporary R&B ballads